Margaret Joan Deahm (31 October 1938 – 28 December 2015) was an Australian politician. She was an Australian Labor Party member of the House of Representatives for the Division of Macquarie from 1993 until her defeat at the 1996 general election.

Deahm was born at Hurstville, and studied arts at the University of New England. She was a public servant from 1966 to 1987, and a freelance writer, editor and consultant from 1987 to 1992. She was a City of Blue Mountains councillor from 1991 until 1993 when she was elected to federal parliament. She served as president and secretary of the Labor Party's Katoomba branch. She was also chair of the Western Sydney Regional Organisation of Councils and a member of the executive of the Local Government Women's Association from 1992 to 1993. She died in December 2015.

References

1938 births
2015 deaths
Australian Labor Party members of the Parliament of Australia
Members of the Australian House of Representatives
Members of the Australian House of Representatives for Macquarie
Women members of the Australian House of Representatives
University of New England (Australia) alumni
New South Wales local councillors
Australian public servants
20th-century Australian politicians
Women local councillors in Australia
20th-century Australian women politicians